Nimapara (Sl. No.: 106) is a Vidhan Sabha constituency of Puri district, Odisha.

This constituency includes Nimapada, Nimapada block and 14 Gram panchayats (Nuakholamara, Rahangorada, Andhra Ichhapur, Ganeswarpur, Gop, Bedapur, Badatara, Nagapur, Bantaligram, Baniasahi, Erabanga, Kuanpada and Payara) of Gop block.

Elected Members

Fourteen elections were held between 1961 and 2019.
Elected members from the Nimapara constituency are:
 
2019: (106): Samir Ranjan Das (BJD)
2014: (106): Samir Ranjan Das (BJD)
2009: (106): Samir Ranjan Das (BJD)
2004: (53): Baidhar Mallick  (BJP)
2000: (53): Baidhar Mallick  (BJP)
1995: (53): Rabindra Kumar Sethy (Congress)
1990: (53): Benudhara Sethy (Janata Dal)
1985: (53): Rabindra Kumar Sethy  (Congress)
1980: (53): Rabindra Kumar Sethy  (Congress-I)
1977: (53): Govinda Chandra Sethi (Janata Party)
1974: (53): Nilamani Singh  (Congress)
1971: (49): Govinda Chandra Sethi (Utkal Congress)
1967: (49): Nilamani Singh (Orissa Jana Congress)
1961: (95): Govinda Chandra Sethi (Congress)

2014 Election Candidates

2009 Election Results
In 2009 election, Biju Janata Dal candidate Samir Ranjan Dash defeated Indian National Congress candidate Satyabrata Patra by a margin of 39,154 votes.

Notes

References

Assembly constituencies of Odisha
Puri district